Andrew John Pycroft (born 6 June 1956) is a former Zimbabwean cricketer who played in 3 Test matches and 20 One Day Internationals from 1983 to 1992.

Domestic career
He played for Rhodesia prior to Zimbabwe's independence. He also represented the Zimbabwean team (1980 onwards) and the Western Province in the South African domestic competition.

After cricket
In March 2006 Pycroft was appointed coach of the Zimbabwe A side, a role he kept until August 2008 when he was sacked along with first-team coach Robin Brown.

Pycroft became a member of the Elite Panel of ICC Match Referees in March 2009.

See also
 Elite Panel of ICC Referees

References

1956 births
Living people
Cricketers from Harare
Zimbabwean people of British descent
White Rhodesian people
White Zimbabwean sportspeople
Zimbabwe Test cricketers
Zimbabwe One Day International cricketers
Zimbabwean cricketers
South African Universities cricketers
Cricketers at the 1983 Cricket World Cup
Cricketers at the 1987 Cricket World Cup
Cricketers at the 1992 Cricket World Cup
Cricket match referees
Western Province cricketers